The 2023 season will be the Michigan Panthers second season in the United States Football League (USFL), their first playing at Ford Field and their first under head coach/general manager tandem of Mike Nolan and Steve Kazor. They will attempt to improve upon their 2–8 record from the previous season and make the playoffs for the first time.

Offseason

Stadium plans
During the 2022 season, the Panthers, and every team in the USFL, played in Birmingham, Alabama. Before the end of that season, the USFL announced plans to move into two or four hubs for teams to play in. In November, the USFL were reportedly exploring options of having a hub in Metro Detroit, with possible locations being the Eastern Michigan Eagles' Rynearson Stadium and the Detroit Lions' Ford Field. On January 26, the USFL chose Ford Field, with Rynearson Stadium to serve as their practice field. The previous iteration of the Michigan Panthers had them playing in the Pontiac Silverdome, which was also home to the Detroit Lions.

Draft 

Prior to the draft order being complete, the Panthers played the Pittsburgh Maulers in the last week of the 2022 season. Both teams came into the game with a league worst 1–8 record. The USFL announced that the winner of the game would hold the first overall pick in the next years' draft, incentivizing the teams to win the game instead of tanking. The Panthers came out victorious 33–21.

The draft only included players that were 2023 draft eligible, contrasting with last years' draft which was to build rosters. Also differing from the 2022 draft, players weren't initially contracted with the USFL prior to the Draft, meaning teams have to negotiate with players to retain their rights. As of February 26, 2023, no player drafted by the Michigan Panthers has signed a contract with the team.

With the first overall pick, the Panthers chose Jarrett Horst out of Michigan State. Horst already declared for the NFL Draft in December 2022.

Additions

Subtractions

Personnel

Roster 
The Panthers, like all other teams, have a 38-man active roster with a 7-man practice squad.

Staff 

On February 3, 2023, head coach Jeff Fisher stepped down to "spend more time with family". The Panthers named Mike Nolan as head coach.

Schedule

Regular Season 

Bold indicates division rival.

Standings

Game summaries

Week 1: at Houston Gamblers

The Panthers will play against Houston Gamblers.

References 

Michigan
2023 in sports in Michigan
Michigan Panthers (2022)